KAVC may refer to:

 Arcata–Eureka Airport (ICAO code KAVC)
 KAVC-LD, a low-power television station (channel 27, virtual 48) licensed to serve Denver, Colorado, United States